Alice Stuart (born June 15, 1942 in Chelan, Washington, United States) is an American blues and folk singer-songwriter and guitarist. She toured the UK with Van Morrison and throughout the United States with Mississippi John Hurt.

Her singing, songwriting, and guitar playing secured her invitations to tour nationally and internationally with Ramblin' Jack Elliott, Doc Watson, Jerry Ricks, Phil Ochs, and Joan Baez, in addition to television appearances on The Dick Cavett Show and the Old Grey Whistle Test. In addition, Stuart's songs have been recorded by Kate Wolf, Irma Thomas, and Jackie DeShannon.

Biography
Stuart started taking piano lessons at the age of five. She picked up the guitar at age 18 and also plays banjo, auto harp, parade snare drum, and bass.

Stuart's early influences as a musician came from classical music, country artists of the 1940s and 1950s such as Hank Snow, Hank Williams, Buddy Holly, Elvis Presley, Roy Orbison, The Everly Brothers and Ivory Joe Hunter, as well as records from the 1920s and 1930s from Blind Willie McTell, Bessie Smith, Rabbit Brown and artist Bob Dylan.

At the age of 22, Stuart played the Berkeley Folk Festival in 1964. She was then invited back by creator/producer Barry Olivier to perform in 1966, and 1970. It was there that she formed a friendship with Mississippi John Hurt, which led to the two touring together.

Billboard magazine reviewed her debut release in 1964 with: "A beautiful new female voice is now on the folk horizon. Its owner's name is Alice Stuart. She sings with a clean freshness that is exciting in its simplicity. A folk find!"

In 1964, Alice met Frank Zappa in a Santa Monica, California coffeehouse. By chance as they both were waiting to meet guitarist Steve Mann. She became a member of Zappa's band, The Mothers of Invention, which at the time played mostly blues. Zappa said he wanted to combine certain modal influences into a basically country blues sound. Alice lasted only a few months and did not make any recordings with the Mothers. She left before their debut album Freak Out!. In 1968 Zappa sarcastically said he fired Alice from the band because she could not play "Louie Louie". However, at the same he also complimented her, saying "she played guitar very well and sang well."

On November 28, 1971, Stuart appeared on BBC Television's Old Grey Whistle Test, a television program that aired in Europe. In addition to Stuart, a group named Redwing appeared, which among others, featured Timothy B. Schmit (later of The Eagles).  Stuart and Redwing were both on the Fantasy label.

In 1972, Stuart sang the title theme song to the X-rated cartoon movie Fritz the Cat, with music done by Ed Bogas.

On January 2, 1973, Stuart appeared on The Dick Cavett Show, hosted at the time by George Carlin. Other guests on the show included Shelley Winters and Jimmy Breslin. During this time, she also performed with Rosalie Sorrells, Jack Elliott, Doc Watson, Jerry Ricks, Phil Ochs, and Joan Baez.

In 1974, Alice sat in with Fantasy Records label-mates, Jerry Garcia and Merl Saunders, several times, including at The Lion's Share in San Anselmo, California.

Guitar Player magazine featured an article on Stuart in 1974, titled, "Well, so much for 'Mary Hamilton'". Rolling Stone profiled Stuart in 1975 in a feature, "Guitars of the Stars", where she was mentioned alongside Chet Atkins, Mike Bloomfield, David Bromberg, Jose Feliciano, Bonnie Raitt, and Doc Watson.

In the autumn 2006, Stuart contributed her song "Highway" to the album project Artists for Charity – Guitarists 4 the Kids, produced by Slang Productions, to assist World Vision Canada in helping underprivileged kids in need.

Currently, she lives in the Seattle area and tours with her band, The Formerlys, which consists of Marc Willett, who was in The Kingsmen from 1984 to 1992, and Steven Flynn, formerly of Chuck Berry's band and Jr. Cadillac.

Discography

Solo albums
 1964: All The Good Times (Arhoolie)
 1970: Full Time Woman (Fantasy / America Records)
 1972: Believing (Fantasy)
 2000: Crazy with the Blues (Country con Fusion)
 2002: Can't Find No Heaven – (Burnside Distribution)
 2006: Live at the Triple Door (Country con Fusion)
 2007: Freedom (Country con Fusion)

Singles
 1970: "Freedom's The Sound" / "Full Time Woman" (America Records)
 1973: "Believe In Someone" / "Golden Rocket" (Fantasy)

As composer
 1971: Grootna – Grootna (Columbia) – track 6, "Full Time Woman"
 1972: Jackie DeShannon – Jackie (Atlantic) – track 6, "Full Time Woman"
 1975: Doris Duke – Woman (Scepter) – track 9, "Full Time Woman"
 1976: Jimmy Rabbitt And Renegade – Jimmy Rabbitt And Renegade (Capitol) – track 8, "I Lose Control"

References

Other sources
 Flatpicking Guitar magazine cover story, March/April 2008
 Music legend can still rock in concert (King County Journal, Bellevue, WA, May 2006)
 Blues veteran brings wealth of experience (Hobart Mercury, Australia, January 2004)
 Relix magazine, February 2003
 Dirty Linen, February 2003
 Acoustic Guitar magazine, February 2003
 Blues guitarist Alice Stuart to play in Salem (Statesman Journal, June 2002)
 Alice Stuart is back for more blues (The Record, New Jersey, April 2001)
 The Mediocrity Predicament: Alice Stuart and Snake, Oakland Tribune, March 1974)
 The Daily Review, April 1975
 Rolling Stone CD review, 1971
 Billboard CD review, 1964

External links
 
 
 
Seattle blues woman itching to get back on road – Seattle Times, January 2008
Stuart makes the shift from sweet folk singer to hot blues guitarist – Seattle Post Intelligencer, January 2006
All set for an encore: Alice Stuart's back, after a blues-song life – The Seattle Times, April 2001

1942 births
Living people
American blues guitarists
American blues singer-songwriters
American folk musicians
Singer-songwriters from Washington (state)
Guitarists from Washington (state)
20th-century American guitarists
People from Chelan, Washington
20th-century American women guitarists
21st-century American women